Cytochrome b5 reductase 4 is an enzyme that in humans is encoded by the CYB5R4 gene.

NCB5OR is a flavohemoprotein that contains functional domains found in both cytochrome b5 (CYB5; MIM 250790) and CYB5 reductase (DIA1; MIM 250800).[supplied by OMIM]

References

Further reading

External links